Pamela Helen Stephenson, Lady Connolly (born 4 December 1949) is a New Zealand-born psychologist, writer, actress and comedian who is now a resident in both the United Kingdom and the United States. She is best known for her work as a performer during the 1980s, particularly in Not the Nine O'Clock News; History of the World, Part I; and Superman III. She has written several books, which include a biography of her husband Sir Billy Connolly, and presented a psychology-based interview show called Shrink Rap on British and Australian television.

Early life 
Pamela Helen Stephenson was born on 4 December 1949 in Takapuna, Auckland. In 1953, she moved to Australia with her scientist parents and two sisters. She attended Boronia Park Primary School in Sydney and then Sydney Church of England Girls' Grammar School, Darlinghurst.

According to her own autobiography, Stephenson was raped at age 16 while she was living in Australia by a 35-year-old heroin addict, contracting an STD as a consequence. She concealed the fact but was expelled from her home by her parents once her medical condition was known: "I remember the feeling well, because I still experience it every time someone rejects me, even in some relatively small way."

Comedy and acting 
Stephenson began her acting career in television. In 1972, she starred as Elsie in the ABC-TV production of the opera The Yeomen of the Guard. She starred during 1972–73 as Julie King in the Australian TV series Ryan. She made numerous television and film appearances, including as Michelle Osgood in the Space: 1999 episode "Catacombs of the Moon" (1976), Josephine in the 1977 ABC production of Malcolm Williamson's opera The Violins of Saint-Jacques, and Wendy in the 1977 New Avengers episode "Angels of Death". She had a supporting role in the inaugural episode of Roald Dahl's  Tales of the Unexpected in 1979. She had another recurring role as Iris Reade in the UK series Funny Man (1981). She made a TV comedy sketch show pilot, Stephenson's Rocket, which was not taken up. Among her first appearances in the UK, she joined the live on-stage team at The Comic Strip led by Rik Mayall, Peter Richardson and Alexei Sayle at the Raymond Revuebar in Soho. This was not a happy experience, according to an interview she gave in 2014: "Doing stand-up was like a war with everyone playing this game of "I can be funnier than you".

Probably her most widely recognised television role was in the 1980s UK comedy television sketch show Not The Nine O'Clock News, alongside Rowan Atkinson, Mel Smith and Griff Rhys Jones (1979–82). Her parodies included Kate Bush in a song called "Oh England, My Leotard" (referencing "Oh England My Lionheart"), and Olivia Newton-John in a song called "Typical Bloody Typical" (referencing "Physical"). She also had a small part in three episodes of the British crime-action television drama series The Professionals. Her personal contribution as a comedian added to the success of Not the Nine O'Clock News, and led to a collaboration with comedy and satire writers Mike Lepine and Mark Leigh. This spawned a book, How To Be A Complete Bitch, and a board game. In 1982–83, she starred in the West End production of Joseph Papp's version of The Pirates of Penzance.

She also featured in the American comedy sketch show Saturday Night Live (SNL) (1984–85) making her the first female SNL cast member born outside North America, and the second overall, joining Tony Rosato. Her characters on the show included Angela Bradleigh (Weekend Update commentator) and celebrity impersonations of Madonna (in a fake commercial parodying the singer's "Lucky Star" music video), Billy Idol, Debby Douillard, Peggy Ashcroft, Joan Collins and Cyndi Lauper.

Stephenson acted in a number of films.

Filmography

TELEVISION

{| class="wikitable plainrowheaders sortable"
|+ Television
|-
! width="50" scope="col" | Year
! width="150" scope="col" | Title
! width="150" scope="col" | Role
! width="350" scope="col" | Type

|-
| 1971-1973
| Division 4
| Sue Lee/Lisa Clark
| TV series AUSTRALIA, 2 episodes
|-
| 1972;1975
| Homicide
| Joan Kendall/Georgina Pearce
| TV series AUSTRALIA, 2 episodes
|-
| 1972
| Matlock Police
| Liz Johnson/Lisa Summers/Jenny Grant
| TV series AUSTRALIA, 3 episodes
|-
| 1972
| Redheap
| Milline Kneebone
| TV series AUSTRALIA, 3 episodes
|-
| 1973-1974
| Ryan
| Julie King
| TV series AUSTRALIA, Lead role 39 episodes
|-
| 1975
| Behind The Legend
| Fanny Cathcart
| TV series AUSTRALIA, 1 episode
|-
| 1976
| Ryan
| Diane Quail
| TV series, 1 episode
|-
| 1976
| The Lively Arts
| Josephine
| TV series UK, 1 episode
|-
| 1976
| Space: 1999
| Michelle Osgood
| TV series UK, 1 episode
|-
| 1976;1978
| Within These Walls
| Prison Officer Dove
| TV series UK, 2 episodes
|-
| 1977
| The New Avengers
| Wendy
| TV series UK, 1 episode
|-
| 1977
| Target
| Susan Clegg
| TV series UK, 1 episode
|-
| 1978
| Hazell
| Gloria
| TV series UK, 1 episode
|-
| 1978
| The Professionals
| Maggie Briggs/Attractive Blonde/Nurse Emma Bolding
| TV series UK, 3 episodes
|-
| 1978
| Something Special
| Herself
| TV series AUSTRALIA, 1 episode
|-
| 1979
| Tales of the Unexpected
| Cathy
| TV series UK, 1 episode
|-
| 1979-1982
| Not the Nine O'Clock News
| Various roles (as Pam Stephenson)
| TV series UK, 27 episodes
|-
| 1980
| Mike Yarwood In Persons
| Herself
| TV series, 1 episode
|-
| 1980;1981
| Friday Night, Saturday Morning
| Herself
| TV series UK, 2 episodes
|-
| 1981
| Call My Bluff
| Herself
| TV series UK, 2 episodes
|-
| 1981
| Scoop
| Herself
| TV series UK, 1 episode
|-
| 1981
| Funny Man
| Iris Reade
| TV series UK, 9 episodes
|-
| 1981
| Fundamental Frolics
| Herself
| TV series UK, 1 episode
|-
| 1981
| The Mike Walsh Show
| Herself
| TV series AUSTRALIA, 1 episode
|-
| 1981
| Parkinson in Australia
| Herself
| TV series AUSTRALIA, 1 episode
|-
| 1982
| Saturday Live
| Herself 
| TV series, 1 episode
|-
| 1982
| The Royal Variety Performance 1982
| Herself
| TV special UK
|-
| 1982
| The Kenny Everett Video Show
| Various roles
| TV series UK, 1 episode
|-
| 1983
| Film '72
| Herself
| TV series UK, 1 episode
|-
| 1983
| The Don Lane Show
| Herself
| TV series AUSTRALIA, 1 episode
|-
| 1984
| Aspel & Company
| Herself
| TV series UK, 1 episode
|-
| 1984
| Spitting Image
| Various voices
| TV series UK
|-
| 1984-1985
| Saturday Night Live
| Various roles
| TV series US, 18 episodes
|-
| 1984
| Hollywood Celebrates the Olympics
| Herself
| TV special US
|-
| 1984
| The Tonight Show Starring Johnny Carson
| Herself
| TV series US, 1 episode
|-
| 1985
| Friday People
| Herself
| TV series UK, 1 episode
|-
| 1985
| The Making Of 'Superman III'''
| Herself/Lorelei (uncredited)
| TV special UK
|-
| 1985
| Des O'Connor Tonight| Herself, 1 episode
| TV series UK
|-
| 1985-1989
| The Midday Show| Herself
| TV series AUSTRALIA
|-
| 1986
| Saturday Live| Herself
| TV series, 1 episode
|-
| 1986
| The Dame Edna Satellite Experience| Herself
| TV special UK
|-
| 1986
| Clive James Show| Herself
| TV series UK, 1 episode
|-
| 1986
| The Bob Monkhouse Show| Herself
| TV series UK, 1 episode
|-
| 1986
| Good Morning Australia| Herself
| TV series, 1 episode
|-
| 1986
| Lost Empires| Lily Farris
| TV miniseries UK, 2 episodes
|-
| 1986
| The 1986 Australian Film Institute Awards
| Herself - Host
| TV special
|-
| 1987
| Ratman| Wombat Woman
| TV series UK, 3 episodes
|-
| 1987
| The Grand Knockout Tournament| Herself
| TV special UK
|-
| 1988
| The N.S.W. Royal Bicentennial Concert| Herself
| TV special AUSTRALIA
|-
| 1989
| Lifestyles of the Rich and Famous| Herself
| TV series UK, 1 episode
|-
| 1989
| A Night of Comic Relief 2| Herself
| TV special UK
|-
| 1989
| The Bert Newton Show| Herself
| TV series, 1 episode
|-
| 1989
| Open to Question| Herself
| TV series UK, 1 episode
|-
| 1989
| Wogan| Herself
| TV series UK, 1 episode
|-
| 1989
| Cilla's Goodbye to the '80s| Herself
| TV special UK
|-
| 1989
| Joy to the World| Herself
| TV special UK
|-
| 1990
| Dame Edna Experience| Herself
| TV series UK, 1 episode
|-
| 1990
| Tonight Live with Steve Vizard| Herself
| TV series AUSTRALIA, 1 episode
|-
| 1990
| MTV| Herself
| TV series AUSTRALIA, 1 episode
|-
| 1990
| Let's Do Lunch... And Save The World| Herself
| TV special UK
|-
| 1990
| Hey Hey It's Saturday| Herself
| TV series, AUSTRALIA, 1 episode
|-
| 1991
| Comic Relief| Herself
| TV special UK
|-
| 1993
| Sex| Herself - Host
| TV series AUSTRALIA
|-
| 1993
| Ray Martin's Top Sorts & Superstars| Herself
| TV special AUSTRALIA
|-
| 1993
| Ray Martin at Midday| Herself
| TV series AUSTRALIA, 1 episode
|-
| 1993
| Inside Edition| Herself
| TV series AUSTRALIA/US
|-
| 1994
| Columbo| Jennifer Chambers - Soap opera actress
| TV series US, 1 episode
|-
| 1994
| Midday with Derryn Hinch| Herself
| TV series AUSTRALIA, 1 episode
|-
| 1999
| Billy Connolly: Erect for 30 Years| Herself
| Video UK
|-
| 2001;2003
| Parkinson| Herself
| TV series UK, 2 episodes
|-
| 2001
| Rove Live| Herself
| TV series AUSTRALIA, 1 episode
|-
| 2002
| Billy Connolly: A BAFTA Tribute| Herself
| TV special UK
|-
| 2003
| The Late Late Show| Herself
| TV series IRELAND, 1 episode
|-
| 2003
| Today with Des and Mel| Herself
| TV series UK, 2 episodes
|-
| 2005
| Kelly| Herself
| TV series UK, 1 episode
|-
| 2006
| The Paul O'Grady Show| Herself
| TV series UK, 1 episode
|-
| 2006
| Life of Pryor: The Richard Pryor Story| Herself
| TV special UK
|-
| 2006
| Murder or Mutiny| Herself
| TV series AUSTRALIA
|-
| 2007
| Richard & Judy| Herself (as Dr Pamela Connolly)
| TV series UK, 1 episode
|-
| 2007
| Mornings with Kerri-Anne| Herself
| TV series AUSTRALIA, 1 episode
|-
| 2007
| Enough Rope with Andrew Denton| Herself
| TV series AUSTRALIA, 1 episode
|-
| 2007
| The Funny Side of the News| Herself
| TV special UK
|-
| 2007;2014
| Loose Women| Herself (as Pamela Stephenson Connolly, Dr. Pamela Stephenson Connolly)
| TV series UK, 4 episodes
|-
| 2007-2010
| Shrink Rap| Herself - Psychologist (as Dr Pamela Connolly)
| TV series UK, 14 episodes
|-
| 2010;2011
| Daybreak| Herself
| TV series UK, 2 episodes
|-
| 2010
| The Graham Norton Show| Herself
| TV series UK, 1 episode
|-
| 2010
| TV Burp| Herself
| TV series UK, 1 episode
|-
| 2010
| Breakfast| Herself - Celebrity dancer
| TV series UK, 2 episodes
|-
| 2010-2016
| Strictly Come Dancing| Herself - Contestant
| TV series UK, 28 episodes
|-
| 2010-2011
| Strictly Come Dancing: It Takes Two| Herself (as Dr. Pamela Stephenson)
| TV series UK, 15 episodes
|-
| 2011
| That Saturday Night Show| Herself
| TV series UK, 1 episode
|-
| 2011
| The One Show| Herself
| TV series UK, 1 episode
|-
| 2011
| The TV Book Club| Herself
| TV series UK, 1 episode
|-
| 2011
| My Favourite Joke| Herself
| TV series UK, 2 episodes
|-
| 2011
| The Book Show| Herself
| TV series UK, 1 episode
|-
| 2011-2012
| This Morning| Herself
| TV series UK, 7 episodes
|-
| 2012
| My Life In Books| Herself
| TV series UK, 1 episode
|-
| 2012
| War Hero In My Family| Herself
| TV series UK, 1 episode
|-
| 2012
| Today| Herself
| TV series AUSTRALIA, 1 episode
|-
| 2012
| Today Extra| Herself
| TV series AUSTRALIA, 1 episode
|-
| 2012
| ABC News Breakfast| Herself
| TV series AUSTRALIA, 1 episode
|-
| 2012
| Sunrise| Herself
| TV series AUSTRALIA, 1 episode
|-
| 2012
| The Morning Show| Herself
| TV series AUSTRALIA, 1 episode
|-
| 2012
| Q&A| Herself - Panel
| TV series AUSTRALIA, 1 episode
|-
| 2012
| Intrepid Journeys| Herself
| TV series NZ
|-
| 2014
| Weekend| Herself
| TV series UK, 1 episode
|-
| 2015
| One Plus One| Herself - Guest
| TV series AUSTRALIA, 1 episode
|-
| 2020
| Billy Connolly: It's Been A Pleasure| Herself (as Pamela Stephenson-Connolly)
| TV special UK
|-
| 2021
| Billy Connolly: My Absolute Pleasure| Herself (as Pamela Stephenson-Connolly)
| TV special UK
|-
| 2022
| Billy Connolly Does...| Herself
| TV series UK, 7 episodes
|}

 Other media appearances 
In 1987, Stephenson participated in Prince Edward's charity television special The Grand Knockout Tournament. In 1993, she hosted the Australian lifestyle program Sex.

In December 2010, Stephenson competed in the eighth series of the BBC1 television show Strictly Come Dancing, consistently winning praise. She received on 4 December a perfect score of 10 from each of the four judges for her Viennese Waltz, becoming only the eighth celebrity (up until that point) to do so. She then reached the final along with Matt Baker and Kara Tointon. On 18 December, with dancing partner James Jordan, she came third in the competition.

Also in December 2010, Stephenson was the guest on BBC Radio 3's Private Passions, with a choice of music including Bellini, Satie and Debussy.  In 2012, Stephenson travelled as a backpacker to Papua New Guinea in the Television New Zealand travel show Intrepid Journeys.

 Psychology 

Stephenson is a US-licensed psychologist who practices and publishes under the name Pamela Stephenson-Connolly. In her private practice in Beverly Hills, she provided mental health care to adult individuals and couples for a range of psychological complaints. Stephenson's professional specialties include human sexuality. She was founder and president of the Los Angeles Sexuality Center, an online sexual research engine that operated for five years until she moved to New York. Stephenson is a past Secretary of the American Association of Sex Educators, Counselors and Therapists (AASECT). In 2002 and 2003, she served as conference program co-chair of the annual AASECT Conference. Stephenson is also a member of the Society for the Scientific Study of Sexuality, the Harry Benjamin International Gender Dysphoria Association and the International Society for the Study of Women's Sexual Health.

Stephenson was an adjunct professor at the California Graduate Institute (CGI – now a part of the Chicago School of Professional Psychology) for six years. She taught Human Sexuality and Sex Therapy, Advanced Human Sexuality and Sex Therapy, and Clinical Practicum in Sex Therapy. She also taught clinical hypnosis at CGI. She received her PhD in 1996, and then in 2009 received an Honorary Doctorate in Science from the Robert Gordon University in Aberdeen for her contributions to the field of human sexuality.

Stephenson has completed research projects and other field studies on the gender-liminal people of Samoa, Tonga, and India. She has also presented the TV show Shrink Rap, in which she conducted psychologically-based interviews with well-known people, including Salman Rushdie, Carrie Fisher and Robin Williams. The programme premièred on More4 on 2 April 2007 and was aired in Australia on ABC2 in 2008.

 Activism 
From the 1980s, Stephenson campaigned to raise awareness of food additives and colours, particularly in children's confectionery. She appeared on the daily variety show Midday with Ray Martin, and painted a picture using the colours she extracted from children's lollies in order to demonstrate how many are contained in them. She became involved in the Parents for Safe Food Movement. In 2010, Stephenson travelled to the Democratic Republic of Congo with the international medical aid charity Merlin to meet the survivors of sexual and gender-based violence (SGBV).

 Personal life 
Stephenson started practising Buddhism in 1979.

Stephenson married actor Nicholas Ball in 1978 but left him shortly afterwards to be with Billy Connolly. She lived with Connolly for ten years before they married in Fiji on 20 December 1989.

 Politics 
In the 1987 United Kingdom general election, Stephenson was a candidate in the Windsor and Maidenhead constituency on behalf of the Blancmange Throwers Party; she came sixth with 328 votes.

Travels

In late 2004, she sold her house in Hollywood and spent a year on a sailing cruise around the South Pacific Ocean, following the path of Robert Louis Stevenson and Fanny Stevenson. She said she was inspired by Fanny (also married to a Scotsman) who had convinced her husband to travel to the tropics for the sake of his fragile health. Her travels were documented in her book Treasure Islands. The boat she bought was renamed "Takapuna" after her birthplace.

A year later, she went on another voyage to discover the fate of an ancestor, a sailing captain who had disappeared in the South Seas. The voyage was the subject of a documentary for Australian television, Murder or Mutiny.

Theatre production
Stephenson formed a dance company in collaboration with Brazilian lambazouk dancer Braz Dos Santos, and wrote and produced a dance-drama stage production called Brazouka. Harley Medcalf was lead producer and Arlene Phillips director. The biographical show told the story of Dos Santos and his dancing. Dos Santos also performed in the show. It premiered at the Edinburgh Fringe Festival in August 2014 and toured South Africa and Australia through January 2015.

Books
As an author, Pamela Connolly has published seven books. Her biography Billy topped best-seller lists in Britain and several other countries. Head Case describes self-help approaches for a variety of mental health problems. She has been a regular contributor to Psychologies magazine, writes a column on relationships for The Australian Women's Weekly and has a weekly sex therapy column in The Guardian, written under the name Pamela Stephenson Connolly.

 References 

Sources

casproduction.com. Dr. Pamela Connolly / Pamela Stephenson  Retrieved 14 July 2008
Waldren, Murray. The Last Laugh: the tears and trauma of comedian Billy Connolly . (First published in The Weekend Australian, 29 September 2001.) Retrieved 14 July 2008.

External links
 
Pamela Stephenson interview on BBC Radio 4 Desert Island Discs'', 23 July 1982

1949 births
20th-century New Zealand actresses
Living people
New Zealand Buddhists
New Zealand expatriates in England
New Zealand expatriates in Australia
National Institute of Dramatic Art alumni
New Zealand television actresses
New Zealand psychologists
University of New South Wales alumni
New Zealand women comedians
People from Takapuna
New Zealand expatriates in the United States
American sketch comedians
American expatriates in England
New Zealand women psychologists
People educated at Sydney Church of England Girls Grammar School
Wives of knights